Sidoli is a surname originating in Italy and prevalent among Welsh Italians. Notable people with this surname include the following:

 Giuditta Bellerio Sidoli (1804–1871), Italian patriot and revolutionary
 John Sidoli (1854–1934), Australian rules footballer and cricket player
 Peter Sidoli (born 1980), Welsh rugby union player, brother of Robert Sidoli
 Robert Sidoli (born 1979), Welsh rugby union player

References 

Italian-language surnames